Wise County Courthouse may refer to:

 Wise County Courthouse (Texas), Decatur, Texas listed on the National Register of Historic Places
 Wise County Courthouse (Virginia), Wise, Virginia